The 2020 LEC season was the second year of the League of Legends European Championship (LEC), a professional esports league for the MOBA PC game League of Legends, following its rebranding in late 2018. The spring regular season began on 24 January and was originally scheduled to conclude on 21 March; however, due to the ongoing COVID-19 pandemic, the season was temporarily suspended on 13 March. Four days later, it was announced that all remaining LEC matches for the spring regular season would be played online, beginning on 20 March.

League changes 
On 23 April 2020, it was announced that the LEC would be given four spots at the 2020 World Championship due to the region's performance in 2018 and 2019. Unlike previous years, all of the LEC's participants at the 2020 World Championship will qualify solely through summer playoffs. Additionally, championship points awarded in the spring and summer regular seasons will no longer determine the LEC's second seed at the World Championship, nor seeding for the regional finals, which has been discontinued. Instead, they will only determine seeding for the summer playoffs. In the event of a tie in championship points, the team which earned more from the summer regular season will be awarded the higher seed.

Tiebreaker matches have also been discontinued; ties are broken either by head-to-head record or win percentage in the second round robin, with the former being considered before the latter.

Broadcasting 
The English broadcast is available on the LoL Esports website, as well as on Twitch and YouTube. On 20 January, Riot Games announced their official partnership with Chinese streaming service Huya, giving them exclusive rights to the Chinese broadcast.

Teams

Spring

Regular season

Playoffs

Individual awards

Summer

Regular season

Championship Points for playoffs seeding

Playoffs

Individual awards

References

External links 
 LEC 2020 Season Official Rulebook

League of Legends
League of Legends European Championship seasons
2020 multiplayer online battle arena tournaments
League of Legends European Championship season, 2020